The 2020–21 Biathlon World Cup – Stage 9 was the 9th event of the season and was held in Nové Město, Czech Republic, from 11 to 14 March 2021.

Schedule of events 
The events took place at the following times.

Medal winners

Men

Women

Mixed

References 

Biathlon World Cup - Stage 9
2020–21 Biathlon World Cup
Biathlon competitions in the Czech Republic
Biathlon World Cup